The Guelph Platers were a junior ice hockey team based in Guelph, Ontario, Canada. The team played in the Ontario Hockey League, Ontario Junior Hockey League, and Southern Ontario Junior A Hockey League.  They were originally known as the CMC's until 1972, the Biltmore Mad Hatters until 1975, and then took on the name Platers.  The Platers were promoted to the Ontario Hockey League in 1982 and moved to Owen Sound in 1989.  The franchise played in the Guelph Memorial Gardens.

History

Early years
The CMC's were founded as members of the Central Junior B Hockey League, now the Ontario Junior Hockey League, in 1968.  In 1970, the CMC's merged with and took the place of the Guelph Beef Kings of the Western Junior "A" Hockey League (formerly the Western Division of the Big 10).  The league was reincorporated into the Ontario Hockey Association and changed its name to the Southern Ontario Junior A Hockey League for the 1970–71 season. CMC was an acronym for Central Mechanical Contractors.

Southern Junior A

After two years playing in the SOJHL, the CMC's won the Junior 'A' league title, in the 1971–72 season. In the Ontario Championship, they took on the Thunder Bay Vulcans of the now defunct Thunder Bay Junior Hockey League. The CMC's were leading 3-games-to-2 (5-4, 5–4, 3–7, 0–7, 6-2) when they won the series by default after the Vulcans discontinued.

Moving onto the Eastern Canadian Final, the CMC's faced Charlottetown from the Island Junior Hockey League. The result of the series was a four-game sweep (5-2, 6–3, 5–2, 5-2), in favour of Guelph.

Guelph travelled to the Centennial Cup versus the Red Deer Rustlers of the Alberta Junior Hockey League.  The CMC's swept the Rustlers (4-2, 3–2, 3–1, 3-0), taking the National title. The team was coached by Bill Taylor and starred Paul Fendley, Doug Risebrough, and John Van Boxmeer.

In 1972 the CMC's changed their names to the Guelph Biltmore Mad Hatters. The Biltmores won the SOJHL championship again in 1975, then defeated the Smiths Falls Bears of the Central Junior A Hockey League in 6 games (8-3, 3–4, 7–2, 6–4, 3–6, 5-2) to reach the Centennial Cup finals a second time.

The Biltmores were defeated 4-games-to-2 (3-4, 2–3, 4–1, 5–2, 6–3, 6-5 OT) by the Spruce Grove Mets of the Alberta Junior Hockey League. The 1975 Biltmores were bolsterted on defence by late season pick-up Craig Hartsburg of Minnesota North Stars fame.

Following the season, the Biltmores were bought by the Holody family, the owners of a local electroplating company. The Holodys changed the team name to the Guelph Holody Platers.

In 1975, the Biltmores of the Southern Ontario Junior A Hockey League (SOJHL) were bought by Guelph, Ontario's wealthy Holody family, the owners of a local electroplating company. The Holodys changed the team name to the Guelph Holody Platers. The team remained in the SOJHL for the next two years, finishing first both times.

OHA Junior 'A' years
The SOJHL folded in 1977. Two of its four teams, Guelph and the Hamilton Mountain A's, became part of the Ontario Hockey Association Junior "A" League. The Platers, featuring future Montreal Canadiens goaltender Brian Hayward, won the 1977–78 Manitoba Centennial Trophy as national Junior 'A' champions. It was the second national title for the franchise, which had also won the Centennial Cup in 1972 as the CMC's.

In 1978–79, the Platers became the first team to win the Dudley Hewitt Cup as provincial champions. In the 1980–81 season, the Platers reached the Tier II championship for southern Ontario, but were defeated by another future OHL team, the Belleville Bulls. The 1981–82 season proved to be the last season for the Platers in the OHA-A. As they won their second Dudley Hewitt Cup, they were announced as the latest expansion team of the Ontario Hockey League.

OHL Major Junior years
After being turned down as an OHL expansion team in 1981, Guelph was approved the next year for the 1982–83 season. Guelph's first season in the OHL was dismal. The team set OHL records at the time for losing 63 of their 70 games, for most home and away losses, and most goals against in one season with 555. All of these records have since been surpassed by other teams in the Canadian Hockey League.

In 1986, the Guelph Platers caught the entire Canadian Hockey League off-guard. Led by coach Jacques Martin, the team reached the playoffs for the first time in franchise history by finishing second in the Emms Division (Western Conference). The Platers continued their hard work through the playoffs, winning the J. Ross Robertson Cup by defeating the Belleville Bulls 8 points to 4 in the final. Guelph travelled to the Memorial Cup that year, bringing home the national championship to complete their Cinderella season.

Memorial Cup 1986
The Memorial Cup championship of 1986 was hosted by the Western Hockey League, with games originally scheduled for New Westminster, British Columbia, but were switched to Portland, Oregon due to a hotel shortage caused by Expo '86. Their opponents would be the Portland Winter Hawks (hosts), Kamloops Blazers (WHL Champs) and the Hull Olympiques (QMJHL Champs.

Guelph finished first in the round-robin and took a bye to the finals, where they would play the Hull Olympiques of the QMJHL for the championship. The surprise season ended with two pairs of surprise goals 11 and 13 seconds apart respectively. The Platers won the game 5–2 to capture the Memorial Cup.

Fame was short-lived for the Platers however. The team suffered through more losing seasons with poor attendance. After the 1988–89 season, the Holodys moved the team to Owen Sound, Ontario, retaining the name "Platers". Alec Campagnaro was given the Bill Long Award for distinguished service to the OHL in 1989.

Championships
SOJAHL Jack Oakes Trophy final appearances: 1971 (lost), 1972 (won), 1975 (won), 1976 (won), 1977 (won)
OPJHL Frank L. Buckland Trophy final appearances: 1978 (won), 1979 (won), 1982 (won)
Ontario Hockey Association Tier II All-Ontario final appearances: 1972 (won), 1975 (won), 1976 (won), 1977 (lost), 1978 (won), 1979 (won), 1982 (won)
CJAHL Dudley Hewitt Cup final appearances: 1972 (won), 1975 (won) 1976 (lost), 1978 (won), 1979 (won), 1982 (won)
CJAHL Centennial Cup final appearances: 1972 (won), 1975 (lost), 1978 (won), 1982 (lost)
J. Ross Robertson Cup final appearances: 1986 (won)
Memorial Cup final appearances: 1986 (won)

Coaches
Jacques Martin was a former NCAA goalie turned coach. In his one year in Guelph, he completely turned around the franchise making them into national champions. He was awarded the Matt Leyden Trophy as OHL Coach of the year in 1986. The following year he was hired as the head coach of the NHL St. Louis Blues.

1982–83 - Don McKee
1983–85 - Joe Contini
1983–85 - J.Contini, Mike Mahoney, Rob Holody
1985–86 - Jacques Martin
1986–87 - Gary Spoar, Rob Holody
1987–88 - Floyd Crawford
1988–89 - Ron Smith

Players

Award winners
1982 - Kirk Muller, Jack Ferguson Award (First Overall draft pick) & 1982-83 William Hanley Trophy (Most Sportsmanlike player)
1983 - Trevor Stienburg, Jack Ferguson Award First Overall draft pick)
1985–86 - Lonnie Loach, Emms Family Award (Rookie of the Year)
1985–86 - Steve Guenette, Leo Lalonde Memorial Trophy (Overage Player of the Year)
1986–87 - Kerry Huffman, Max Kaminsky Trophy (Most Outstanding Defenceman)
1986–87 - John McIntyre, Bobby Smith Trophy (Scholastic Player of the Year)

Retired numbers
18 - Paul Fendley, a member of the SOJAHL's Guelph CMC's who died in an on-ice accident at Guelph Memorial Gardens in 1972. His number has not been issued to a player since, by the Guelph CMC's, Guelph Platers, or Guelph Storm. Paul Fendley's number was officially retired on Nov 15, 2008.

Paul Fendley of Georgetown, Ontario was a member of the 1971-72 Guelph CMC's who died as a result of an on ice accident at Guelph Memorial Gardens during Guelph's Centennial Cup 1972 victory. The 19-year-old player died at Kitchener-Waterloo General Hospital on May 8, 1972, seventy-three hours after striking his head on the arena ice.

Fendley was checked by an opponent with 11 minutes to play in the game. He tried to catch his balance while still handling the puck and lost his helmet in the process, falling and striking the bare back of his head on the ice.

Fendley was the 1972 SOJHL Leading Scorer with 20 goals and 24 assists in 43 games. He also scored 14 goals and 18 assists in 26 playoff games before his accident. The game in which he was fatally injured was the final and clinching game of the Centennial Cup.

NHL alumni
Platers

Brian Bradley
Paul Brydges
Steve Chiasson
Adam Creighton
Dan Gratton
Steve Guenette
Craig Hartsburg
Brian Hayward
Todd Hlushko
Kerry Huffman
Denis Larocque
Guy Larose
Lonnie Loach
Brian MacLellan
Grant Martin
John McIntyre
Al MacIsaac
George McPhee
Kirk Muller
Mike Murray
Gary Roberts
Warren Rychel
David Shaw
Doug Shedden
Ron Smith
Trevor Stienburg
Sean Whyte
Rob Zamuner

CMC's/Mad Hatters

 Kirk Bowman
 Scott Campbell
 Tony Cassolato
 Joe Contini
 Craig Hartsburg
 Doug Risebrough
 John Van Boxmeer

Yearly results

Regular season

Playoffs
SOJHL Years
1971 Lost Final
Guelph CMC's defeated Chatham Maroons 4-games-to-1 with 1 tie
Detroit Jr. Red Wings defeated Guelph CMC's 3-games-to-2 with 2 ties
1972 Won League, Won Hewitt-Dudley Memorial Trophy, Won 1972 Centennial Cup
Guelph CMC's defeated St. Thomas Barons 4-games-to-none
Guelph CMC's defeated Detroit Jr. Red Wings 4-games-to-1 SOJHL CHAMPIONS
Guelph CMC's defeated Sault Ste. Marie Greyhounds (NOJHA) 3-games-to-none
Guelph CMC's defeated Thunder Bay Vulcans (TBJHL) 4-games-to-2
Guelph CMC's defeated Charlottetown Islanders (Independent) 4-games-to-none HDM TROPHY CHAMPIONS
Guelph CMC's defeated Red Deer Rustlers (AJHL) 4-games-to-none CENTENNIAL CUP CHAMPIONS
1973 Lost Final
Guelph CMC's defeated Detroit Jr. Red Wings 4-games-to-none
Guelph CMC's defeated Windsor Spitfires 4-games-to-none
Chatham Maroons defeated Guelph CMC's 4-games-to-3 with 1 tie
1974 Lost Quarter-final
Chatham Maroons defeated Guelph CMC's 4-games-to-none with 1 tie
1975 Won League, Won OHA Buckland Cup, Won Hewitt-Dudley Memorial Trophy, Lost 1975 Centennial Cup
Guelph CMC's defeated Welland Sabres 4-games-to-1
Guelph CMC's defeated Chatham Maroons 3-games-to-2 with 2 ties
Guelph CMC's defeated Windsor Spitfires 4-games-to-3 with 1 tie SOJHL CHAMPIONS
Guelph CMC's defeated Toronto Nationals (OPJHL) 4-games-to-2 BUCKLAND CUP CHAMPIONS
Guelph CMC's defeated Thunder Bay Eagles (TBJHL) 4-games-to-1
Guelph CMC's defeated Smiths Falls Bears (CJHL) 4-games-to-2 HDM TROPHY CHAMPIONS
Spruce Grove Mets (AJHL) defeated Guelph CMC's 4-games-to-2
1976 Won League, Won OHA Buckland Cup, Lost Hewitt-Dudley Memorial Trophy semi-final
Guelph Platers defeated Welland Sabres 4-games-to-1
Guelph Platers defeated Chatham Maroons 4-games-to-none SOJHL CHAMPIONS
Guelph Platers defeated North Bay Trappers (OPJHL) 4-games-to-1 BUCKLAND CUP CHAMPIONS
Guelph Platers defeated Thunder Bay Eagles (TBJHL) 4-games-to-1
Rockland Nationals (CJHL) defeated Guelph Platers 4-games-to-3
1977 Won League, Lost OHA Buckland Cup
Guelph Platers defeated Owen Sound Greys 4-games-to-2 with 1 tie
Guelph Platers defeated Collingwood Blues 4-games-to-none SOJHL CHAMPIONS
North York Rangers (OPJHL) defeated Guelph Platers 4-games-to-3
OPJHL Years
1978 Won League, Won Hewitt-Dudley Memorial Trophy, Won 1978 Centennial Cup
Guelph Platers defeated Wexford Raiders 4-games-to-none
Guelph Platers defeated North Bay Trappers 4-games-to-2
Guelph Platers defeated Royal York Royals 4-games-to-1 OPJHL CHAMPIONS
Guelph Platers defeated Degagne Hurricanes (TBJHL) 4-games-to-none
Guelph Platers defeated Pembroke Lumber Kings (CJHL) 4-games-to-1
Guelph Platers defeated Charlottetown Eagles (IJHL) 4-games-to-2 HDM TROPHY CHAMPIONS
Guelph Platers defeated Prince Albert Raiders (SJHL) 4-games-to-none CENTENNIAL CUP CHAMPIONS
1979 Won League, Won OHA Buckland Cup, Won Dudley Hewitt Cup, Lost 1979 Centennial Cup round robin
Guelph Platers defeated Markham Waxers 4-games-to-none
Guelph Platers defeated North York Rangers 4-games-to-none
Guelph Platers defeated Dixie Beehives 4-games-to-1 OPJHL CHAMPIONS
Guelph Platers defeated Nickel Centre Native Sons 2-games-to-none BUCKLAND CUP CHAMPIONS
Guelph Platers defeated Thunder Bay North Stars (TBJHL) 4-games-to-none
Guelph Platers defeated Hawkesbury Hawks (CJHL) 4-games-to-2 DUDLEY HEWITT CUP CHAMPIONS
Third and eliminated in 1979 Centennial Cup round robin (1-3)
1980 Lost Quarter-final
North York Rangers defeated Guelph Platers 4-games-to-3
1981 Lost Final
Guelph Platers defeated Brampton Warriors 4-games-to-none
Guelph Platers defeated North York Rangers 4-games-to-3
Belleville Bulls defeated Guelph Platers 4-games-to-1
1982 Won League, Won OHA Buckland Cup, Won Dudley Hewitt Cup, Won Eastern Canada Championship, Lost 1982 Centennial Cup
Guelph Platers defeated North York Rangers 4-games-to-none
Guelph Platers defeated Richmond Hill Rams 4-games-to-none
Guelph Platers defeated Markham Waxers 4-games-to-1 OJHL CHAMPIONS
Guelph Platers defeated Onaping Falls Huskies (NOJHL) 3-games-to-none BUCKLAND CUP CHAMPIONS
Guelph Platers defeated Thunder Bay Kings (TBJHL) 3-games-to-none
Guelph Platers defeated Pembroke Lumber Kings (CJHL) 4-games-to-none DUDLEY HEWITT CUP CHAMPIONS
Guelph Platers defeated Moncton Hawks (NBJHL) 4-games-to-1 EASTERN CANADA CHAMPIONS
Prince Albert Raiders (SJHL) defeated Guelph Platers 4-games-to-none

Platers transfer to Ontario Hockey League.
1982–83  Out of playoffs.
1983–84  Out of playoffs.
1984–85  Out of playoffs.
1985–86  Defeated Sudbury Wolves 8 points to 0 in first round. Won quarter-final round robin vs. North Bay Centennials & Windsor Spitfires. Defeated Windsor Spitfires 8 points to 4 in semi-finals. Defeated Belleville Bulls 8 points to 4 in finals. OHL CHAMPIONS Finished first in round-robin of Memorial Cup. Earned bye to finals. Defeated Hull Olympiques 5–2 in finals. MEMORIAL CUP CHAMPIONS
1986–87  Lost to Hamilton Steelhawks 4 games to 1 in first round.
1987–88  Out of playoffs.
1988–89  Lost to London Knights 4 games to 3 in first round.

Arena
The Guelph Platers played at the Guelph Memorial Gardens located in downtown Guelph. The team and the arena played host to the OHL All-Star game in 1984. Demolition of the Gardens began in 2006.

Guelph Memorial Gardens The OHL Arena & Travel Guide

The Imperials
The City of Guelph was unhappy with the fact that their Junior A team had been moved to Kitchener in 1963.  Left with only the Guelph CMC's at the OHA Junior B level, the City jumped at the 1968 offer of the newly-renegade Western Ontario Junior A Hockey League to give the city a new Junior A team.  After a pair of losing seasons and a name change to the Beef Kings, the league was reincorporated into the OHA as a Tier II Junior A league and the franchise being bought out by the CMC's.  From that point on, the CMC's took the Beef King's place.

Season-by-season results

Playoffs
1969 Lost Semi-final
Brantford Foresters defeated Guelph Imperials 4-games-to-1
1970 Lost Semi-final
Brantford Foresters defeated Guelph Beef Kings 4-games-to-none

References

Defunct Ontario Hockey League teams
Sport in Guelph
1968 establishments in Ontario
1989 disestablishments in Ontario
Ice hockey clubs established in 1968
Ice hockey clubs disestablished in 1989